David Wright (5 October 1905 – 1955) was a Scottish footballer who played for Liverpool.

Life and playing career
Born in Kirkcaldy, Fife, Scotland, Wright played for East Fife, Cowdenbeath and Sunderland before George Patterson signed him for Liverpool in March 1930. His debut came at Anfield as Liverpool drew 0–0 with Newcastle in a 1st Division match on 21 April 1930. His first goal came 10 months later on 7 February 1931, also against Newcastle: Wright scored a hat-trick in the 4–2 win, the goals coming in the 21st, 60th and 80th minutes.

Wright was originally used as back-up for Jimmy Smith and because of this was called upon just 15 times in his first full season, even though during one of these appearances he scored a hat-trick. The following season was much better for Wright as he began the campaign by scoring 5 goals in the first 4 fixtures, he ended with 13 goals in his 35 starts. Wright followed this up with a 14-goal total during the 1932–33.

Wright began as first choice at the beginning of the 1933–34 season starting in 9 of the first 10 games, he, however, lost his place to Syd Roberts and although Roberts couldn't hold on to the position it was Harold Taylor rather than Wright that got the nod.

Wright played exactly 100 games for the Reds with the 100th coming on 31 March 1934, Derby were the visitors to Anfield for a league game that saw Liverpool gain a 4–2 victory.

Wright left Liverpool in July 1934 joining Hull, he went on to represent Bradford Park Avenue before retiring. He died in his hometown in 1955.

References

External links
Player profile at LFChistory.net

1905 births
1955 deaths
Date of death missing
Footballers from Kirkcaldy
Scottish footballers
Association football forwards
East Fife F.C. players
Cowdenbeath F.C. players
Sunderland A.F.C. players
Liverpool F.C. players
Hull City A.F.C. players
Bradford (Park Avenue) A.F.C. players